HD 196050 is a triple star system located in the southern constellation of Pavo. This system has an apparent magnitude of 7.50 and the absolute magnitude is 4.01. It is located at a distance of 112 light years from the Sun based on parallax, and is drifting further away with a radial velocity of +61 km/s. It is also called by the Hipparcos number 101806.

Characteristics
The primary component is a G-type main-sequence star with a stellar classification of G3V. It has a quiescent chromosphere and does not appear to be variable. The star has 18% more mass than the Sun and a 46% greater size. It is around 2.5 billion years old with a higher than solar metallicity, and is spinning with a projected rotational velocity of 3 km/s. The star is radiating 2.21 times the luminosity of the Sun from its photosphere at an effective temperature of 5.834 K.

Planetary system
In 2002, the Anglo-Australian Planet Search team announced the discovery of an extrasolar planet orbiting the star. The discovery was independently confirmed by the Geneva Extrasolar Planet Search team.

See also 
 HD 190228
 HD 195019
 List of extrasolar planets

References

Further reading

G-type main-sequence stars
M-type main-sequence stars
Planetary systems with one confirmed planet
Triple stars
Pavo (constellation)
Durchmusterung objects
Gliese and GJ objects
142022
079242